Lois Grace McMahan (née Norbo; May 14, 1942 – August 6, 2019) is an American educator and politician from Washington. McMahan is a former Republican member of Washington House of Representatives for District 26, from 1995 to 1997 and again from 2003 to 2005.

Early life 
On May 14, 1942, McMahan was born in Culdesac, Idaho.

Education 
In 1963, McMahan earned a Bachelor of Arts degree and a Teaching Certificate from Prairie College.

Career 
In 1963, McMahan became an elementary school teacher, until 1969.

On November 8, 1994, McMahan won the election and became a Republican member of Washington House of Representatives for District 26, Position 1. McMahan defeated Ron Meyers with 53.93% of the votes. 
On November 5, 2002, McMahan won the election and became a Republican member of Washington House of Representatives for District 26, Position 2. McMahan defeated Brock Jackley with 50.64% of the votes.

Personal life 
McMahan's husband was Jerry McMahan. They had five children. McMahan and her family lived in Olalla, Washington.

References

External links 
 Members of Legislature 2011 at leg.wa.gov
 Lois McMahan at ourcampaigns.com

1942 births
Living people
Republican Party members of the Washington House of Representatives
Women state legislators in Washington (state)